Yasmin Le Bon (née Parvaneh; born 29 October 1964) is an English model. She was one of the highest-earning models during the 1980s and is also known for being the wife of pop star Simon Le Bon.

Early life
Yasmin Parvaneh was born in Oxford, England, the younger child of an Iranian father and an English mother. Yasmin attended Cherwell School in Oxford.

Her mother worked as a window dresser in Elliston's, a department store in Oxford, when she met Yasmin's father. Her mother died of breast cancer in 2004. Her father has also died.

Career
She modelled for a local agency while she attended school, and after leaving signed with Models 1 Agency in London.

In April 1987, she was hired by Guess for an advertising campaign.

She appeared on the cover of the first American and British issues of Elle and has also been on the covers of Vogue, V, I.D., Cosmopolitan, Marie Claire and Harper's Bazaar. As a model, she has also represented Ann Taylor, Banana Republic, Bergdorf Goodman, Biotherm, Bloomingdale's, Bonwit Teller, Calvin Klein, Versace, Chanel, Christian Dior, Clairol, Escada, Filene's, Frasercard, Avon and Gianfranco Ferré.

In 1992 she appeared in the Michael Jackson's video "Who is it".

In January 2012, Le Bon wore a gown weighing  in the Stéphane Rolland spring/summer Haute Couture show in Paris.

Other endeavours 

Le Bon was invited to be one of the drivers in the 2013 Mille Miglia race in Italy. Each year, the three-day event passes through nearly 200 Italian towns from Brescia to Rome and back, recreating the original races which took place between 1927 and 1957. She and her co-driver, David Gandy, were part of Team Jaguar, driving a 1950 Jaguar XK120. Early in the race, Le Bon and Gandy were "pushed off the road by a competitor" which caused body damage to the wing and side of the vintage car. They re-entered the race, ultimately finishing in 158th place out of 415 cars.

Personal life
In 1984, she met Simon Le Bon, lead singer of the new wave band Duran Duran. They married on 27 December 1985 in her hometown of Oxford.

The couple have three daughters, all born in London, including Amber Rose Tamara (born August 1989).

References

Further reading

External links

 Yasmin Le Bon on the Fashion Model Directory
 

1964 births
English female models
English people of Iranian descent
Living people
People from Oxford